Södertörn University (abbreviated as SH) is a public university college located in Flemingsberg in Huddinge Municipality, and the larger area called Södertörn, in Stockholm County, Sweden. In 2013, it had about 13,000 full-time and part-time students. The campus area in Flemingsberg hosts the main campus of SH, several departments of the Karolinska Institutet, and the School of Technology and health of the Royal Institute of Technology (KTH). The Karolinska University Hospital, Huddinge (formerly Huddinge Hospital), is also located there. The university is unique in the sense that it is the only higher educational institution in Sweden that teaches and researches philosophical schools such as German idealism, existentialism, deconstruction as well as critical theory and other views which are excluded from the traditional Anglo-Saxon analytical philosophy.

History 
Södertörn University was established as a university college in 1996 following a parliamentary decision in 1995. The expansion of higher education in the southern parts of Stockholm had then been investigated for a long time. The background was that the transition to higher education was low in the southern parts of Stockholm, unemployment was high and segregation problems tended to be large. Stockholm University did not consider it appropriate to increase the number of students of Stockholm University and a university in Södertörn should be independent and not part of the University of Stockholm. Karolinska Institutet had already relocated their dental education to Flemingsberg. KTH and Stockholm University had facilities in Flemingsberg and Novum Research Park was under construction.

At the university's inception in 1996, there were around 1,000 students. SH had facilities in Södertälje, Flemingsberg and Haninge. Initially the pro-vice chancellor of Stockholm University was also vice-chancellor of Södertörn University, but on 1 January 1997, Per Thullberg was appointed vice-chancellor and SH also attained the right to award their own degrees. In 2002 the main building Moas båge (Moa's crescent) was inaugurated in Flemingsberg. The building  also received the Concrete Products Outdoor Environment Prize in 2003. With the new facilities the teacher education program was moved from Södertälje to Flemingsberg. In spring 2006, the university's board operations decided to move from campus Haninge to campus Flemingsberg by autumn 2008 and phase out the Södertälje campus where teaching had already been discontinued.

Södertörn University applied to the government to become a university in 2002. The application has not yet been processed. In 2004 Södertörn University applied together with Karolinska Institutet and KTH for approval to create a university network at Södertörn University based on the same model as the University of Oxford in the United Kingdom. In May 2006, an updated version of the university application was submitted to the government, including changes implemented since 2002. On 1 July 2010, the Swedish Higher Education Authority granted Södertörn University the right to award doctoral degrees in the areas of Historical Studies, Critical and Cultural Theory, Environmental Studies and Politics, Economy and the Organisation of Society.

At the end of 2013 Södertörn University was awarded the task of providing the basic training programme for the police. It will run as contract education and will cover five semesters of full-time studies, including a six-month traineeship at a police authority. The first 180 police cadets started their education at Södertörn University in January 2015.

In 2013 Södertörn University had 12,578 students, of whom 6,984 were full-time students.

Departments 
Södertörn University has four academic schools:
 Department of Historical and Contemporary Studies
 Department of Culture and Education
 Department of Natural Sciences, Technology and Environmental Studies
 School of Social Sciences

Subjects 
Subjects at the university:

Science 
Södertörn University carries out research in the humanities, social sciences, science, environment, technology and educational science.

Institutes and research centres 
The primary purpose of the research centres is to bring academic added value by focusing on scientifically interesting fields that lie at the intersections of traditional disciplines. This way the university wishes to create a creative meeting place for staff and students.
  Centre for Baltic and East European Studies (CBEES)
  The Academy of Public Administration
  Centre for Studies in Practical Knowledge
  ENTER forum for research on entrepreneurship
  The Institute of Contemporary History (SHI)
  The Stockholm Centre on Health of Societies in Transition  (SHOHOST)
  Maritime Archaeological Research Institute at Södertörn University

Södertörn University Library 
The Södertörn University Library building was designed by Christer Malmström Arkitektkontor AB, and has received one of Sweden's most prestigious prizes for architecture, the Kasper Salin Prize. The 11,000 square metre building contains the library's collection, examination rooms, study areas and has 700 study spaces. The library was opened in 2004.

Vice-chancellors 
 1 January 1997 – 31 December 2002: Per Thullberg
 2003 – 30 June 2010: Ingela Josefson
 1 July 2010 – 30 June 2016: Moira von Wright 
 1 July 2016–: Gustav Amberg

Notable people

Faculty 
 Sara Danius, Professor of Aesthetics, former Member (2013–2019) and Permanent Secretary (2015–2018) of the Swedish Academy.
 Aris Fioretos, Professor of Aesthetics.
 Yvonne Hirdman, Professor of Contemporary History.
 Ebba Witt-Brattström, Professor of Literature.
 Mark Bassin, Professor in historical and contemporary studies.

Alumni 
 Kodjo Akolor, TV and radio personality.
 Esabelle Dingizian, politician, Third Deputy Speaker of the Riksdag (2014–2018).
 Kristian Gidlund, musician and author.
 Jytte Guteland, politician, 
 Anna-Karin Hatt, corporate leader and politician, Minister for IT and Regional Affairs (2009–2011) and Minister for IT and Energy (2011–2014) of Sweden.
 Mohamed Said, actor.

See also 
List of colleges and universities in Sweden

References 

 
University colleges in Sweden
Higher education in Stockholm
Educational institutions established in 1996
1996 establishments in Sweden